Khorramabad, alternatively romanized as Khorramābād, Khoramabad, Khurramabad, Khorram Abad, or Khur Ramābād, is a city and the capital of Lorestan Province, Iran. At the time of the 2016 census, its population was 373,416 persons. Khorramabad is situated on the Zagros Mountains. Khorramabad Airport is 3 km south of the city proper. Khorramabad is the largest Luri-speaking city in Iran.

The city population is predominantly Lur and Kurds. Although not a major tourist destination, it is quite scenic and possesses several attractions, such as five Paleolithic cave-dwelling sites. In the city center, a tall citadel called Falak-ol-Aflak (The Heaven of Heavens), a relic of the Sassanid era, is now a nationally popular museum.

History

Pre-Islamic era

Simash 
During the late third millennium B.C. and early second millennium B.C., when Simashki sovereigns was ruling on Elam, for the first time a fort was built on the peak of a natural cliff to protect the city against its enemies. Six hundred years later, Ellipi kings built a new fort on the ruins of the old one. Simash was the name of the place. It was the capital of Simashki dynasty.

Shapurkhast
In the texts of historians Shapurkhast has been considered one of the most important and developed cities of the region during this period. Falak-ol-Aflak castle ( Dež-e Shāpūr-Khwāst) was built by Shapur I the Sassanid king.

Islamic era
Probably in the late seventh century AD, Shapurkhast was conquered by the Arabs in 633 AD and destroyed and the people of Shapurkhast moved to the western part of Falak-ol-Aflak Castle, which offered plenty of water as well as safety.

Hamdallah Mustawfi writes: "Khorramabad was a beautiful city, now it is destroyed."

Hazaraspids
The founder of the Hazaraspid dynasty was Abu Tahir ibn Muhammad, a descendant of the Shabankara chieftain Fadluya. Fadluya was initially a commander of the Salghurids of Fars and was appointed governor of Kuhgiluya, but eventually gained independence in Luristan and extended his realm as far as Isfahan. He assumed the prestigious title of atabeg.

Safavid dynasty
During the reign of the Safavid dynasty, Khorramabad was the administrative center of Luristan Province. In the wake of the demise of the Safavids, after the signing of the Treaty of Constantinople (1724) with Imperial Russia, the Ottomans conquered Khorramabad on the 6th of September 1725.

Qajar dynasty
In this period, the city of Khorramabad was limited to environs of Falak-ol-Aflak Castle. This period was the beginning of a migration of people from small villages into Khorramabad. The increase in population led to the expansion of the city and the creation of new districts.

Pahlavi dynasty
Khorramabad Municipality was formed in 1913 and the first city council, consisting of seven members, was formed in 1916.

Geography

Location 
The city is located inside a valley and has been surrounded by mountains. The two main mountains around the city are EspiKouh (SefidKouh) and Makhmalkouh. The city is rich of underground resources and five main springs passes through it. It has one river called as Gelal or KhorramRud (new name).

Climate 
KhorramAbad has mild and semi-humid Mediterranean climate with high amount of rainfall during spring and winter. It is the sixth cities in Iran having high level of annual rainfall.  
Khorramabad has what is classed under the Köppen climate classification as a Hot-summer Mediterranean climate (Csa) climate. Its elevation is 1147.8 above sea level. Average annual precipitation is 511.06 and its average annual temperature is 17.21 Celsius.

Main sights

ShapurKhast Castle 

ShapurKhast Castle, sometimes referred to as Dež-e Shāpūr-Khwāst, Falak-ol-Aflak Castle, and known in ancient times as Dezbaz as well as Shapur-Khast, is one of the most impressive castles in Iran. It is situated on the top of a large hill with the same name within the city of Khorramabad, the regional capital of Lorestan province. The Khorramabad River runs past the eastern and south-western side of the ShapurKhast hill providing the fortress with an element of natural protection. Today, the western and northern sides of the hill are bordered by the residential districts of Khorramabad.
This gigantic structure was built during the Sassanid era (226–651). It has been known by a number of names since it was built over 1800 years ago. Recorded names have referred to it as Shapur-Khast fortress, Dezbaz, Khorramabad castle, and ultimately the Falak ol-Aflak Castle.
The foundations of the actual castle measure approximately 300 meters by 400 meters. The height of the entire structure, including the hill, reaches up to 40 meters above the surrounding area. This space is divided into four large halls, and their associated rooms and corridors. The rooms all surround two courtyards with the following measurements: the first courtyard measures 31×22.50 meters and the second 29x21 meters. When originally built the castle used to have 12 towers, but only 8 remain standing today. The building's entrance is situated towards the north, within the body of the north-western tower.

From the initial day of erection the castle served a variety of purposes including political, military, governmental and social. Now, Dec. 2019,  archaeology and anthropology museums are located inside the castle. Bronzes of Lorestan are among the interesting handmade objects inside the archaeology museum. This scarce monument has been inscribed on the National Heritage List under the registration number of 883.

Gerdaw Bardina 
Gerdab Sangi or Gerdaw Bardina is a cylindrical shape monument from Sassanid dynasty (224-651 CE) located in Takhti Square. The main construction materials are lime-mortar and rocks exploited from SefidKouh mountain. Encircling several springs, the edifice sits near the prehistoric Qamari Cave. The construction was once used for rationing and distributing potable and agricultural water among local population and farmers. Its surrounding cylindrical stone wall has a height of 10 meters and a diameter of 18 meters.
There are a few different-sized outlets in the wall for controlling the flow of water into a canal on the west of the structure. Originally, there were 7 of such outlets, however today only one is functional. This outlet measures 160 x 90 centimeters and opens and closes like a drawer. There are traces of another outlet where water was flowing from it and was reaching to a stream called Nahre Naseri. The flowing water after a path of approximately 12 kilometers, would eventually make its way to a valley called Baba Abbas. The main interesting thing is the way that they have conducted the water to the stream. Gerdab Sangi has been inscribed on the National Heritage List in 1976.

Brick minaret 
Brick Minaret is a cylindrical brick tower from Seljuq and Buyid dynasties located inside the ancient city of Shapur khast, south of Khorramabad.

ُThis Iranian minaret is a combination of the Indian Stupa, commemorative columns, and the central Asia tradition of tower building for defensive and communication purposes. Brick Minaret of KhorramAbad was probably used as a guidepost for caravans that pass the city, i.e. communication purpose.

The current height of the minaret is 29.45 meters. Since one of the windows of the minaret is located on top of it, undoubtedly its height was higher. A cylindrical column was built inside the minaret and through 99 spiral staircases around the column one can reach to the top of the minaret. The entrance is opened to the west and its characteristics are as follows: length: 80 cm, height: 220 cm. The minaret has six windows of different sizes. The windows spread the light into the dark corridor. Brick and mortar are its main construction material.

This monument has been inscribed on the national heritage list under registration number 1930.

Sang Nebeshteh 
Sang Nebeshteh (inscribed stone) is an engraved cubic shape monument with 3.54 m heights located at the eastern part of KhorramAbad city. It dates back to 1119 AD during the Saljuq dynasty. It has been written in Kufic script and its subject is governmental rules of ShapurKhast, which is currently known as KhorramAbad city. The carved name of ShapurKhast city can be clearly seen on this monument. This name verifies the existence of ShapurKhast city during old days. It has been inscribed on the national heritage list.

Pole Gap (Gap Bridge) 

Pole Gap is a Safavid multi-arch bridge passing through KhorramAbad city and located near to ShapurKhast castle. Its twenty arches, except its breakwaters and piles, are made from bricks and mortar. The height of the bridge is about 18 meters. Some of its arches are in the underground of the shops on either sides of the bridge. The bridge is very similar to Si-o-se-pol at Isfahan.
About fifty years ago, an inscription has been found inside one of the ruined arches. The inscription has two meters length and 85 centimeters height. Probably, it has been written to protect the bridge form evil eyes and natural phenomena.

Sahpuri Bridge (Tage Pil Eshkesa) 

Shapuri bridge has been constructed on KhorramAbad river (Gelal river) by the order of Shapur I during Sassanian period. It was built in the historic rout between Shapurkhast, Tarhan and Ctesiphon, the capital of Sassanian.  Lorestan has more than 70 historical bridges, and form this perspective is considered as the capital of ancient Iranian bridges.

Shapuri bridge has 312 meters length and elongated in the east–west direction. Some scholars believe that this bridge was the first gigantic bridge in Lorestan province, and other bridges in the province has been built by inspiring from it. It has 28 arches and 27 piles, with a surface area of 61 square meters. Currently, five of its arches are intact; the others have been destroyed by natural phenomena. The arches of the bridge are made in the form of a wishbone. The piles and breakwaters of the bridge are in the form of six lateral lozenges made of limestone. The bridge was likely also used to distribute water. Materials of the bridge are river stones and stone chips in the arches and truncated stones in the piles. The bridge floor is paved in red block stones that have lost their square shape due to erosion. This attractive, huge bridge from Sassanid dynasty has been inscribed in the national heritage list under registration number 1058.

Akhound Abu House 

Akhound Abu House is located in the historical texture of KhorramAbad city near to BabaTaher neighborhood and ShapurKhast castle.

It belonged to Mirza Mohsen Gazi, who was chief justice of the city during late Qajar and early Pahlavi dynasties.

The house is semi-introverted and is divided into winter and summer sections. The first one, which is used during winter, has two important rooms: Panjdari and Sedari. Panjdari is also called Shahneshin and was the most attractive room of the house. Muqarnas, Zigzag bricks (Khefteh-Rasteh), Golandaz are the main decoration of the house. The construction materials of the house are stone, brick, wood and mortar.

Currently, museum of Lorestan's handicrafts is located inside the house. Tickets to visit this house are free. This monument has been inscribed on the national heritage list under registration number 2432.

Keeyow lake 

Keeyow lake is a natural lake located in the Northwest of Khorramabad city. In 1975, It has been constructed by the order of Ali Mohammad Saki, the late mayor of KhorramAbad.  This lake spans a seven-hectare area and has a depth of 3 to 7 meters. It is the only natural lake in Iran that is located inside a city. The lake is an appropriate place for aquatic animals and native and migratory birds. The amusement park as well as other recreational facilities next to the lake enhances its aesthetic and geotouristic values. The main spring of the lake is located in the northern part of the lake and is supplied by aquifers from nearby mountains. Since the spring is a seasonal one, during winter the water is supplied from another permanent spring located under ShapurKhast castle, Golestan spring.

During holidays, many tourists and locals spend their leisure time in the amusement park or use other facilities inside a park located near to the lake, Keeyow Park. It is the most important park of the city. Every morning, many locals come to use the sporting facilities and/or hike or run around the lake.

Colleges and universities

Islamic Azad University of Khorram Abad
Lorestan University
Lorestan University of Medical Sciences
Madanni Technical College

Sister cities and twin towns

Photo gallery

See also

List of World Heritage Sites in Iran

References

External links 
 
 Khorramabad municipality 

 
Towns and villages in Khorramabad County
Cities in Lorestan Province
Iranian provincial capitals
Archaeological sites in Iran
Ancient Iranian cities
Architecture in Iran
Places in Shahnameh